Alisher Rahimov (born October 23, 1977) is an amateur boxer from Uzbekistan. He won the gold medal at the 1999 Asian Amateur Boxing Championships in his home nation and competed for the bantamweight division at the 2000 Summer Olympics in Sydney. He defeated South Korea's Cho Seok-Hwan and Algeria's Hicham Blida in the first two rounds, until he lost to Russia's Raimkul Malakhbekov in the quarterfinal match.

References

External links
 WBC Boxing - List of champions

1977 births
Living people
Sportspeople from Tashkent
Boxers at the 2000 Summer Olympics
Olympic boxers of Uzbekistan
Uzbekistani male boxers
Bantamweight boxers